Ateng Wahyudi (March 16, 1936 – September 16, 2009) was the mayor of Bandung, West Java, Indonesia. He was mayor between 1983 and 1993.

References

1936 births
2009 deaths
People from Bandung
Place of birth missing
Mayors of Bandung
Mayors of places in Indonesia